The Bytom Odrzański mine is a large mine in the west of Poland in Bytom Odrzański, Nowa Sól County, 360 km south-west of the capital, Warsaw. Bytom Odrzański represents one of the largest copper and silver reserve in Poland having estimated reserves of 31.5 million tonnes of ore grading 2.47% copper and 56 g/tonnes silver. The annual ore production is around 0.7 million tonnes from which 17,300 tonnes of copper and 39.2 tonnes of silver are extracted.

References

External links 
 Official site

Copper mines in Poland
Nowa Sól County